Hans-Jürgen Boysen (born 30 May 1957) is a German football manager and former player. Before, he managed SV Sandhausen and Wormatia Worms.

He has a son, Kim-Pascal Boysen, who is also a football player.

References

External links

1957 births
Living people
Association football defenders
German footballers
German football managers
FC Augsburg managers
Karlsruher SC players
1. FC Saarbrücken players
Bundesliga players
2. Bundesliga players
FSV Frankfurt managers
Stuttgarter Kickers managers
Kickers Offenbach managers
2. Bundesliga managers
SV Sandhausen managers
3. Liga managers
SG Sonnenhof Großaspach managers
Footballers from Baden-Württemberg
Wormatia Worms managers